Ng Wa Seng (born 2 August 1999) is a Macanese footballer who currently plays as a defender for Hong Kong First Division club Central & Western and the Macau national football team. Besides Macau, he has also played in Hong Kong.

Career statistics

Club

Notes

International

References

External links
 Profile at HKFA

1999 births
Living people
Macau footballers
Macau international footballers
Association football midfielders
Expatriate footballers in Hong Kong
Hong Kong First Division League players
Sun Hei SC players